The Hiro H4H (or Hiro Navy Type 91 Flying Boat) was a 1930s Japanese bomber or reconnaissance monoplane flying boat designed and built by the Hiro Naval Arsenal for the Imperial Japanese Navy.

Design and development
First appearing in 1931 the H4H1 was a twin-engined high-wing monoplane flying-boat. Powered by two 500 hp (597 kW) Hiro 91-1 engines strut-mounted above the wing it was produced by the Kawanishi company and entered service in 1933.

An improved version of the design, the H4H2, followed into production two years later. The H4H2 has re-designed twin fins and rudders and was powered by two 800 hp (597 kW) Myojo radial engine. A total of 47 of both versions was produced.

Both the H4H1 and H4H2 remained in front-line naval service through the 1930s.

Variants
H4H1 (Hiro Navy Type 91 Model 1 Flying Boat)
Variant powered by two 500hp (597kW) Hiro 91-1 engines.
H4H2 (Hiro Navy Type 91 Model 2 Flying Boat)
Variant powered by two 800hp (597kW) Myojo radial engines.

Operators

Imperial Japanese Navy Air Service

Specifications (H4H2)

See also

References

Notes

Bibliography

1930s Japanese patrol aircraft
World War II Japanese patrol aircraft
Flying boats
High-wing aircraft
H4H
Twin piston-engined tractor aircraft